Arantxa Sánchez Vicario was the defending champion but lost in the quarterfinals to Brenda Schultz.

Steffi Graf won in the final 4–6, 6–1, 6–2 against Natasha Zvereva.

Seeds
A champion seed is indicated in bold text while text in italics indicates the round in which that seed was eliminated. All thirty-two seeds received a bye to the second round.

  Steffi Graf (champion)
  Arantxa Sánchez Vicario (quarterfinals)
  Gabriela Sabatini (quarterfinals)
  Jana Novotná (quarterfinals)
  Kimiko Date (quarterfinals)
 n/a
  Lindsay Davenport (semifinals)
  Amanda Coetzer (fourth round)
  Natasha Zvereva (final)
  Zina Garrison-Jackson (fourth round)
  Helena Suková (second round)
  Nathalie Tauziat (fourth round)
  Judith Wiesner (third round)
  Lori McNeil (fourth round)
  Natalia Medvedeva (second round)
  Katerina Maleeva (third round)
  Patty Fendick (third round)
  Naoko Sawamatsu (fourth round)
  Leila Meskhi (fourth round)
  Amy Frazier (fourth round)
  Yayuk Basuki (second round)
  Julie Halard (second round)
  Brenda Schultz (semifinals)
  Chanda Rubin (third round)
  Ginger Helgeson (third round)
  Meike Babel (third round)
  Miriam Oremans (second round)
  Patricia Hy (third round)
  Florencia Labat (fourth round)
  Stephanie Rottier (second round)
  Meredith McGrath (third round)
  Marianne Werdel (third round)

Draw

Finals

Top half

Section 1

Section 2

Section 3

Section 4

Bottom half

Section 5

Section 6

Section 7

Section 8

References
 1994 Lipton Championships Draw

Women's Singles
Lipton Championships - Women's Singles